Jay Mulafer (born 1984) is a Sri Lankan Radio Personality best known for presenting Lite FM’s morning radio show “The Lite Café”.

Career

While studying at D. S. Senanayake College Colombo, he joined the TNL Radio Network as a trainee Radio Personality in 2003 and started hosting the Lite Café from 2004 onwards. Throughout his stint as the host and producer of the “Lite Café” the show was continuously rated as one of the top English morning shows in Sri Lanka.

Lite Cafe
As the host of the Lite Café, Jay was known for his observations and witticisms on Sri Lankan politics. Along with former Sri Lankan rugby player, sports administrator and broadcaster Chandrishan Perera, Jay popularized the sports segment “All Sport” which garnered a keen following among sports fans.

References

External links 
 http://www.thesundayleader.lk/20080203/IMAGES/NOW/page%20-4.pdf
 http://sundaytimes.lk/110320/Magazine/sundaytimesmirror_01.html
 http://www.dailymirror.lk/entertainment/music/1898-lite-fm-celebrates-11-years-on-air-.html
 https://archive.today/20130218223642/http://archives.dailymirror.lk/2007/02/27/life/05.asp
 http://www.dailymirror.lk/entertainment/music/1616-a-brief-glimpse-at-jay-from-the-lite-cafe-.html
 http://www.island.lk/2009/03/16/L3.pdf

Living people
1984 births
Sri Lankan radio personalities